John Francis Nangle (June 8, 1922 – August 24, 2008) was a United States district judge of the United States District Court for the Eastern District of Missouri.

Education and career

Born in St. Louis, Missouri, Nangle received an Associate of Arts degree from Harris Teachers College (now Harris–Stowe State University) in 1941, a Bachelor of Science degree from the University of Missouri in 1943, and a Juris Doctor from Washington University School of Law in 1948. He was in the United States Army as a Sergeant from 1943 to 1946. He was in the United States Army Reserve as a Captain in the JAG Corps from 1946 to 1971. He was in private practice in St. Louis and Clayton, Missouri from 1948 to 1973. He was city attorney of Brentwood, Missouri from 1953 to 1963. He was a special legal adviser for the Government of St. Louis County from 1963 to 1973.

Federal judicial service

Nangle was nominated by President Richard Nixon on June 13, 1973, to a seat on the United States District Court for the Eastern District of Missouri vacated by Judge William H. Webster. He was confirmed by the United States Senate on July 13, 1973, and received his commission on July 18, 1973. He served as Chief Judge from 1983 to 1990. He assumed senior status on May 10, 1990. Nangle served in that capacity until his death on August 24, 2008, in Savannah, Georgia. Nangle moved to Savannah in 1990 immediately after taking senior status and sat with the United States District Court for the Southern District of Georgia until just a few months before his death.

References

Sources
 

1922 births
2008 deaths
Judges of the United States District Court for the Eastern District of Missouri
United States district court judges appointed by Richard Nixon
20th-century American judges
Harris–Stowe State University alumni
University of Missouri alumni
Washington University School of Law alumni
United States Army officers
United States Army personnel of World War II